The NewYork-Presbyterian Healthcare System is a network of independent, cooperating, acute-care and community hospitals, continuum-of-care facilities, home-health agencies, ambulatory sites, and specialty institutes in the New York metropolitan area.  , the System was the largest receiver of Medicare payments in the United States.

NewYork-Presbyterian Hospital, along with Weill Cornell Medicine and Columbia University Vagelos College of Physicians and Surgeons run the system.

Each hospital in the system is an affiliate of either of the two medical colleges.

To become a part of the system, institutions must meet standards of the organization and to remain in it, "each must continue to pursue a quality agenda, which includes review and evaluation of clinical, operational, and financial data," according to the Web site of the organization. Member institutions share their knowledge and expertise, including knowledge of best practices in various fields.

List of hospitals in the system 

These hospitals, in addition to NewYork-Presbyterian Hospital and its connected hospitals, are in the system:

New York City 

 Gracie Square Hospital in Manhattan, New York
 Hospital for Special Surgery in Manhattan, New York (Cornell)
 Lower Manhattan Hospital in Manhattan, New York (Cornell)
 NewYork-Presbyterian Brooklyn Methodist Hospital in the Park Slope section of Brooklyn, New York
 NewYork-Presbyterian/Queens in Queens, New York
 Morgan Stanley Children's Hospital in Manhattan, New York

New York State 

 Helen Hayes Hospital in Haverstraw, New York (Columbia)
 Lawrence Hospital Center in Bronxville, New York (Columbia)
 Mary Imogene Bassett Hospital in Cooperstown, New York (Columbia)
 Westchester Division in White Plains, New York
 Hudson Valley Hospital in Cortlandt Manor, New York

Connecticut 

 Stamford Hospital in Stamford, Connecticut (Columbia)

Long-term care institutions in the system 

 Amsterdam Nursing Home
 Fort Tryon Center For Rehabilitation And Nursing
 Franklin Center For Rehabilitation And Nursing
 Freidwald Center For Rehabilitation And Nursing
 Manhattanville Health Care Center
 Menorah Home and Hospital
 New York United Hospital Medical Center Skilled Nursing Pavilion
 St. Barnabas Nursing Home
 St. Mary's Hospital for Children
 Shore View Nursing Home
 The Silvercrest Center For Nursing and Rehabilitation
 Tandet Center for Continuing Care (part of Stamford Hospital)

Specialty institutes in the system 

 Community Healthcare Network
 Gracie Square Hospital
 Helen Hayes Hospital
 New York College of Podiatric Medicine & Foot Clinics of New York
 The Rogosin Institute

References

External links 

 NewYork-Presbyterian Healthcare System

 
Hospital networks in the United States